In the Absence() is a 2018 South Korean–American short documentary film that depicts the sinking of the MV Sewol in 2014, in which three hundred people  mostly school children from Danwon High School  lost their lives.

Production
The film was requested by the film distributor Field of vision,who was looking for a short documentary regarding the background for the 2016 Candelight Vigil for the impeachment of then South Korean president Park Geun-hye. With guilt that he has not participated in documenting the moments of the sewol incident as it happened, the film has focused on tracing the origins of the sufferings caused by the incident. In the original version, there was a scene that involved the mothers of the drowned students crying as the salvaged vessel approached the dock, but was cut from the final version,saying that such overwhelming reactions will prevent the audience from empathizing with the mothers. The film was produced by Gary Byung-Seok Kam and directed by Yi Seung-Jun, with Seung-Jun beginning the process of interviewing the victims families on camera in 2017. The documentary is seen as separated from other documentaries about the disaster, due to the fact that it highlights the disaster and not just the events leading up to the event and/or those responsible for the tragedy.

Format 
The documentary utilizes audio from first responders and government officials, aerial video from choppers, and cell phone video and multi-media messages from the victims of the ferry sinking to showcase the disaster in real time. The entire documentary is roughly 29-minutes long, and highlights how the disaster could have been avoided and the aftermath of the disaster such as the Candlelight Protests and the Impeachment of Park Geun-hye.

Awards 

The documentary was awarded the 2018 grand jury prize for short competition in DOC NYC, a documentary film festival in the United States.

In the Absence was nominated for an Academy Award for Best Documentary (Short Subject) at the 92nd Academy Awards. Before this nomination (and Parasite’s nominations), no South Korean film had ever been nominated for an Oscar.

See also 
 Sinking of MV Sewol
 2019 in film

References

External links 
 In the Absence at Field of Vision
 , posted by Field of Vision
 

2018 films
American short documentary films
South Korean short documentary films
Documentary films about MV Sewol
Documentary films about maritime disasters
Documentary films about South Korea
Films about castaways
2018 short documentary films
2010s American films
2010s South Korean films